The Francis West Smith House is located in Brodhead, Wisconsin. It was added to the National Register of Historic Places in 1979 and to the State Register of Historic Places in 1989.

References

Houses on the National Register of Historic Places in Wisconsin
National Register of Historic Places in Green County, Wisconsin
Houses in Green County, Wisconsin
Italianate architecture in Wisconsin
Brick buildings and structures
Houses completed in 1877
1877 establishments in Wisconsin